The 1993 Cal State Hayward Pioneers football team represented California State University, Hayward—now known as California State University, East Bay—as a member of the Northern California Athletic Conference (NCAC) during the 1993 NCAA Division II football season. Led by 19th-year head coach Tim Tierney, Cal State Hayward compiled an overall record of 3–6 with a mark of 2–2 in conference play, tying for second place in the NCAC. The team was outscored by its opponents 294 to 188 for the season. The Pioneers played home games at Pioneer Stadium in Hayward, California.

In January 1994, Cal State Hayward announced they were dropping the football program as a cost-cutting measure and to make a move toward reaching gender equity in their athletic program.

Schedule

References

Cal State Hayward
Cal State Hayward Pioneers football seasons
Cal State Hayward Pioneers football